The Severn Formation is a Mesozoic geologic formation in Maryland. Dinosaur remains diagnostic to the genus level are among the fossils that have been recovered from the formation.

Paleofauna

Dinosaurs 
 "Coelosaurus" antiquus
 Ornithomimidae indet.
Hadrosauridae indet.

Plesiosaurs 
 Cimoliasaurus magnus

Mosasaurs 
 Halisaurus platyspondylus
 Prognathodon rapax
 Mosasaurus hoffmanni
 Mosasaurus sp.
 cf. Mosasaurus conodon
 Mosasauridae indet.

Crocodylomorphs 
 Deinosuchus rugosus
 Thoracosaurus neocesariensis
 Alligatorinae indet.

Turtles 
 Peritresius ornatus
 Osteopygis emarginatus
 Trionyx priscus
 Toxochelyidae indet.

Chondrichthyans 

 Carcharias holmdelensis
 Carcharias samhammeri
 Chiloscyllium greeni
 Cretalamana appendiculata
 Dasyatis sp.
 Tomewingia problematica
 Galeorhinus garadoti
 Ginglymostoma sp.
 Heterodontus sp.
 Hybodus sp.
 Ischyrhiza cf. avonicola
 Ischyrhiza mira
 Myliobatis sp.
 Odontaspis aculeatus
 Plicatoscyllium antiquum
 Plicatoscyllium derameei
 Pseudohypolophus mcnultyi
 Ptychotrygon vermiculata
 Raja farishi
 Rhinobatos sp.
 Rhombodus binkhorsti
 Serratolamna serrata
 Squalicorax kaupi
 Squalicorax pristodontus
 Squatina hassei
 Ischyodus sp.

Osteichthyans 

 Albuidae indet.
 Anomoedus cf. haseolus
 Cylinadracanthus sp.
 Egertonia sp.
 Enchodus ferox
 Hadrodus sp.
 Lepidosteus sp.
 Paralbula casei

See also

 List of dinosaur-bearing rock formations
 List of stratigraphic units with few dinosaur genera

Footnotes

References
 Weishampel, David B.; Dodson, Peter; and Osmólska, Halszka (eds.): The Dinosauria, 2nd, Berkeley: University of California Press. 861 pp. .

Maastrichtian Stage of North America
Cretaceous Maryland